The T-55AGM is a medium tank, a Ukrainian modernization of the T-54/T-55 developed by the Kharkiv Morozov Machine Building Design Bureau. The T-55AGM rebuild package can also be applied to Chinese made Type 59s and the Soviet T-62. As these upgrades are developed for export only, the variants may differ greatly in accord with the customer.

Description
The tank is fitted with a 5TDFM, two-stroke liquid-cooled multi-fuel supercharged diesel engine with opposed pistons which develops 850 horsepower (hp) (634 kW), improved running gear. The driver has an automated movement control system with a steering handlebar control.

The T-55AGM has built-in explosive reactive armour, countermeasures system, new fire suppression system with over-ride facilities at the commander's station, automatic loader which holds 18 rounds and anti-aircraft machine gun that can be aimed and fired from within the turret under a complete armour protection. The anti-aircraft machine gun is installed on the commander's cupola and can be fired at air or ground targets.

Prospective buyers can choose between two main smoothbore gun armament options: 125 mm KBM1 or 120 mm KBM2. The tank can carry at least 30 rounds. The 125 mm KBM1 smoothbore gun weighs 2.5 tonnes, has a barrel length of 6 m (48 calibers) and can fire armour-piercing fin-stabilized discarding sabot (APFSDS), high-explosive anti-tank (HEAT), and high explosive (HE) fragmentation (HE-FRAG) rounds, while the 120 mm KBM2 smoothbore gun weighs 2.63 tonnes, has a barrel length of 6 m (50 calibers) and can fire all types of ammunition that meet the requirements of NATO standards and Ukrainian-made ATGMs. The tank can be armed with either a KT-7.62 or the PKT-7.62 coaxial machine gun and can carry 3,000 rounds for it, and either a KT-12.7 or NSVT-12.7 heavy machine gun for AA protection and can carry 450 rounds for it. The approximate successful range is  during day and  during night. The AA HMG can be elevated between -5 to +70 degrees. The remote control for anti-aircraft machine gun is stabilized in the vertical axis during automatic mode (by using the TKN-5 sight) and is using the PZU-7 sight for semi-automatic mode.

See also
T-54/T-55 operators and variants
T-54/T-55
Tifon 2a

References

External links
 , Morozov Machine Building Design Bureau

Tanks of Ukraine